Revelation Time is an album by Max Romeo, released in 1975. It was re-released by United Artists Records in 1978 as Open the Iron Gate.

The album explored religious and social problems-oriented themes, and is regarded as Romeo's best album, along with War Ina Babylon. Initially, it was available only in Jamaica, where it was re-released in 1977 as Warning Warning! with re-arranged track listing. The album saw its international release in 1978 as Open the Iron Gate, again with altered running order. In 1999 an anthology Open the Iron Gate: 1973-77 was released, consisting of the Revelation Time material and bonus tracks. On July 3, 2020, remastered Revelation Time with 19 tracks was released from 17 North Parade label.

Track listing

Original release
All tracks composed by Max Romeo; except where indicated
Side A
"Revelation Time" (Max Romeo, Pete Weston) – 2:44
"No Peace" (Clive Hunt) – 3:39
"Tacko" (Clive Hunt) – 2:47
"Blood of the Prophet" (Clive Hunt, Sepi) – 3:27
"Blood of the Prophet Pt. II" (Clive Hunt, Sepi) – 3:00
Side B
"Warning, Warning" – 3:54
"A Quarter Pound of I'cense" – 2:40
"Three Blind Mice" (Lee Perry, Max Romeo) – 2:57
"Open the Iron Gate" – 2:57
"Open the Iron Gate Pt. II" – 2:25

Warning Warning!
Side A
"Warning, Warning"
"A Quarter Pound of I'cense"
"Three Blind Mice"
"Open the Iron Gate"
"Open the Iron Gate Pt. II"
Side B
"No Peace"
"Revelation Time"
"Tacko"
"Blood of the Prophet"
"Blood of the Prophet Pt. II"

Open the Iron Gate
Side A
"Open the Iron Gate" – 5:29
"No Peace" – 3:38
"Tacko" – 2:40
"Blood of the Prophet" – 6:04
Side B
"Warning, Warning" – 3:52
"A Quarter Pound of I'cense" – 2:37
"Three Blind Mice" – 2:57
"Revelation Time" – 2:45

2020 edition

Singles
1973: "Three Blind Mice"
1975: "Revelation Time"

Personnel
Max Romeo - vocals
Aston "Family Man" Barrett, Clive Hunt, Geoffrey Chung, George Fullwood - bass
Carlton "Santa" Davis, Carlton Barrett, Derrick Stewart, Michael Richards - drums
Earl "Chinna" Smith, Filberto Callendar, Geoffrey Chung, Michael Murray, Tony Chin - guitar
Bernard "Touter" Harvey, Clive Hunt, Geoffrey Chung, Robert Lyn, Tyrone Downie - keyboards
Tyrone Downie - harmonica
Clive Hunt, Lee Perry, Michael Murray - percussion
Bobby Ellis, Richard "Dirty Harry" Hall, Tommy McCook - horns
Technical
Geoffrey Chung - executive producer
George Philpott, Lee Perry - engineer
Geoffrey Chung, Ronald Logan - mixing

References

1975 albums
Max Romeo albums